Ocinje (in older sources also Ocinja,  or Guitzendorf, Prekmurje Slovene: Oucinje) is a small village in the Municipality of Rogašovci in the Prekmurje region of northeastern Slovenia, right on the border with Austria. In 1941 the village was ceded to Germany due its purely German inhabitants. The population of Ocinje was expelled in 1945 and replaced by Slovenians.

References

External links
Ocinje on Geopedia

Populated places in the Municipality of Rogašovci